‌The 2021 South and Central American Women's Handball Championship was the second edition of the championship and held from 5 to 9 October 2021 at Asunción, Paraguay under the aegis of South and Central America Handball Confederation. It was the first time in history that the championship is organised by the Paraguay Handball Confederation. It also acted as the qualification tournament for the 2021 World Women's Handball Championship, with the top three teams qualifying.

Brazil won the tournament for the second time after a finals win over Argentina.

Qualified teams

Because Nicaragua was not able to found enough money for the trip, they were replaced by Chile.

Standings

Results
All times are local (UTC−3).

Statistics and awards

Top goalscorers

All-Star team
The All Star Team was announced on 11 October 2020.

Notes

References

South and Central American Women's Handball Championship
South and Central American Women's Handball Championship
South and Central American Women's Handball Championship
South
October 2021 sports events in South America
International sports competitions in Asunción